Kouk Romiet is a khum (commune) of Thma Puok District in Banteay Meanchey Province in north-western Cambodia.

Villages
Kouk Romiet contains twenty villages.

Kouk Prich
In 1998, the village of Kouk Prich had a population of 1,452 (718 men and 734 women) in 268 households.

Srae L'a
In 1998, the village of Srae L'a had a population of 1,660 (803 men and 857 women) in 357 households. 

Kouk Romiet
In 1998, the village of Kouk Romiet had a population of 778 (381 men and 397 women) in 148 households.

Sdau
In 1998, the village of Sdau had a population of 203 (93 men and 110 women) in 39 households.

Thmei
In 1998, the village of Thmei had a population of 1,127 (559 men and 568 women) in 242 households.

Ta Lei
In 1998, the village of Ta Lei had a population of 399 (186 men and 213 women) in 89 households.

Sereika
In 1998, the village of Sereika had a population of 143 (77 men and 66 women) in 28 households.

Ta Song
In 1998, the village of Ta Song had a population of 459 (234 men and 225 women) in 96 households.

Trapeang Samraong
In 1998, the village of Trapeang Samraong had a population of 112 (55 men and 57 women) in 21 households.

Phlov Bambaek
In 1998, the village of Phlov Bambaek had a population of 196 (101 men and 95 women) in 41 households.

Thma Chhatr
In 1998, the village of Thma Chhatr had a population of 218 (113 men and 105 women) in 49 households.

Voa Preng
In 1998, the village of Voa Preng had a population of 329 (175 men and 154 women) in 66 households.

Pram Minea
In 1998, the village of Pram Minea had a population of 190 (95 men and 95 women) in 40 households.

Sameakki
In 1998, the village of Sameakki had a population of 1,039 (536 men and 503 women) in 227 households.

Banteay Mean Rit
In 1998, the village of Banteay Mean Rit had a population of 3,902 (1,998 men and 1,904 women) in 825 households.

Spean
In 1998, the village of Spean had a population of 240 (124 men and 116 women) in 51 households.

Kandaol

Kdoeb Thmor
In 1998, the village of Kdoeb Thmor (also Kdeb Thmar) had a population of 487 (241 men and 246 women) in 101 households.

Boeng Ta Srei
In 1998, the village of Boeng Ta Srei had a population of 348 (173 men and 175 women) in 73 households.

Boeng Sokrom

References

 All coordinates from 

Communes of Banteay Meanchey province
Thma Puok District